Acianthera ochreata is a species of orchid native to eastern Brazil.

References 

ochreata
Flora of Brazil